Shridhar Phadke (born 9 September 1950) is a famous Marathi language music composer from Maharashtra, India.

Early life
Shridhar Phadke was born on 9 September 1950 in Mumbai. He is son of the famous Marathi singer and composer Sudhir Phadke and singer Lalitabai Phadke.
He completed his education from D. G. Ruparel College of Arts Science and Commerce and later did his post graduation in Information Technology in United States of America in the decade of 1970. Later he joined Air India. He retired from Air India as Executive Director-IT in the year 2009.

He has not undergone any formal training for music. When Shridhar Phadke was in USA for his post graduation, he composed his first tune for a devotional song Devachiye Dwari. Sudhir Phadke heard this song and appreciated the tune. Sudhir Phadke also sung this song in one of his programs in the USA. Later this song was recorded in the voice of Suresh Wadkar for album Omkar Swaroopa.

Career
Shridhar Phadke started his career as a music director with the film Laxmichi Paule. Earlier it was decided that Sudhir Phadke would compose music for this film. But the director heard the tune of the song 'Phite Andharache Jaale' composed by Shridhar Phadke. He liked the tune very much and decided to include this song in the film. Later it was decided that all songs from this film be composed by Shridhar Phadke.

Composer
Shridhar Phadke has composed music for many Hindi, Marathi films. Some of them can be listed as:
Laxmichi Paule
Hridaisparshi
Gharabaaher
Vaarsa Laxmicha
Putravati
Lekru
Vishwavinayak

Shridhar Phadke has composed many independent albums as well. Some of the very famous albums are:
Rutu Hirawa
Bhavdhara
Swarvel
Gajavadan Sundar Devotional songs sung by Anuradha Paudwal
Omkar Swaroopa
Aboliche Bol
He Gagana
Tejomaya Naadabramha
Kaahi Bolayache Aahe
Tallin Govinde
Sur Varada Rama
Phite Andharache Jaale
Sangeet Manamohi Re
Rat Re Gurucharani
Avagha Vitthaloo
Lilaav
 Sakar gandhar ha (2013)
 Sadaphuli (2016)

Concerts

Shridhar Phadke regularly performs all over the world. Following are some of his concerts:
Rutu Hirawa Songs composed by Shridhar Phadke
Babujinchi Gaani Songs composed/sung by Sudhir Phadke
Geet Ramayan Songs from Geet Ramayan
Phite Andharache Jaale Mix songs composed/sung by Shridhar Phadke and Sudhir Phadke
Omkar Swaroopa Devotional songs composed by Shridhar Phadke

Awards
Shridhar Phadke has won many prestigious awards for his compositions. These include:

 Filmfare Award (Marathi) (1994) for Best Music for film Varsa Laxmicha
 Filmfare Award (Marathi) (1996) for Best Music for film Putravati
 Filmfare Award (Marathi) (2000) for Best Music for film Lekaru.

External links
 Songs composed by Shridhar Phadke on Aathavanitil Gani website
 
 Pune City honours Shridhar Phadke on his 60th anniversary
 Article in Marathi weekly Lokprabha on completion of 25 years to release of album Omkar Swaroopa

References

Marathi people
Indian film score composers
1950 births
Living people
Indian male playback singers
Singers from Mumbai
Marathi-language singers
Marathi playback singers
Indian male film score composers